Besteland is a village in Valle municipality in Agder county, Norway. The Norwegian National Road 9 runs through the village.

References

Villages in Agder
Valle, Norway